When Two Worlds War is a 1993 video game by Impression Games. It is a strategic simulation of interplanetary conflict.

Critical reception 
Amiga Format thought the game was neither simplistic nor shallow. Meanwhile, CU Amiga Magazine felt the game was identical to Utopia in every way, sans the fun.

Computer Gaming Worlds Martin Cirulis praised the packaging and the manuals, with the interface being described as "exceptionally clear and easy to use." On the gameplay front, he felt that the game lacked personality, with "potential strengths... left unexplored." He found the AI too easy to win against, even at the highest level. Overall, he thought that while the game was not bad, the delivery fell short of the potential, comparing the game to getting Battlestar Galactica when Star Wars was what had been promised.

References

External links 
 Mobygames

1993 video games
Amiga games
Business simulation games
DOS games
Video games developed in the United Kingdom
Impressions Games games